The Miss North Carolina Teen USA competition is the pageant that selects the representative for the state of North Carolina in the Miss Teen USA pageant and is part of the RPM Productions group.

North Carolina has been moderately successful at Miss Teen USA, but has never won the title. Their best placement was in 1987, 2006 and 2016 when Peggy Blackwell, Melissa Lingafelt and Emily Wakeman placed first runner-up respectively. North Carolina's greatest success came from the mid-1980s to early 1990s.  Their most recent placement came in 2018, when Kaaviya Sambasivam placed fourth runner-up. North Carolina, along with Illinois and Florida, has the most Miss Photogenic award winners in the pageant with three each.

Five Miss North Carolina Teen USA's has crossed over to win the Miss North Carolina USA title. The first was Chelsea Cooley, who went on to win the Miss USA title and place in the top 10 at Miss Universe. The second was Erin O' Kelley, Miss North Carolina Teen USA 2001 who made the top 15 at Miss USA 2007. The third was Julia Dalton who was a second runner up in Miss Teen USA 2008. However, she didn't place at Miss USA 2015. And the fourth was Katie Coble, a second runner up in Miss Teen USA 2007 and a non finalist in Miss USA 2017. The fifth was Jane Axhoj, a second runner up in Miss Teen USA 2015.

Kristen Dalton, who came in first-runner up at the 2005 Miss North Carolina Teen USA pageant to Nikkie Groat, went on to win Miss North Carolina USA in 2009, and won the title of Miss USA 2009. She represented the United States at the Miss Universe pageant in August 2009. Her younger sister Kenzie Dalton, who was first-runner up at the 2006 Miss North Carolina Teen USA pageant, became engaged to actor Chad Michael Murray the same year she placed first-runner up to Melissa Lingafelt (who placed first-runner to Katie Blair of Montana at Miss Teen USA 2006.) Their mother, Jeannie Dalton (Boger) was Miss North Carolina USA 1982, and their sister Julia Dalton was Miss North Carolina Teen USA 2008, and placed second-runner up to Stevi Perry of Arkansas at Miss Teen USA 2008. Julia was Miss North Carolina USA in 2015 and didn't place at the Miss USA 2015 pageant.

Gabby Ortega of Raleigh was crowned Miss North Carolina Teen USA 2022 on January 29, 2022 at High Point Theater in High Point. She will represent North Carolina for the title of Miss Teen USA 2022.

Results summary

Placements
1st runners-up: Peggy Blackwell (1987), Melissa Lingafelt (2006), Emily Wakeman (2016)
2nd runners-up: Katie Coble (2007), Julia Dalton (2008), Jane Axhoj (2015) 
4th runners-up: Kaaviya Sambasivam (2018)
Top 6: Holly Furman (1991), Rachel Adcock (1992), Ali Burr (1997)
Top 10: Tracey Kaggell (1984), Kimberly Jordan (1985)
Top 16: Kat Puryear (2012), Peyton Brown (2020), Gabriela Ortega (2022)
North Carolina holds a record of 15 placements at Miss Teen USA.

Awards
Miss Congeniality: Holly Furman (1991)
Miss Photogenic: Rachel Adcock (1992), Melissa Lingafelt (2006), Gabriela Ortega (2022)

Winners 

Color key

1 Age at the time of the Miss Teen USA pageant

References

External links
Official website

North Carolina
Women in North Carolina